The 2010 Texas gubernatorial election was held on Tuesday, November 2, 2010, to elect the governor of Texas. Incumbent Republican Governor Rick Perry ran successfully for election to a third consecutive term. He won the Republican primary against U.S. Senator Kay Bailey Hutchison and political newcomer, Debra Medina. The former mayor of Houston, Bill White, won the Democratic nomination. Kathie Glass, a lawyer from Houston and previous candidate for Texas Attorney General, won the Libertarian nomination. Deb Shafto was the nominee of the Texas Green Party. Andy Barron, an orthodontist from Lubbock, was a declared write-in candidate.

Exit polls showed Perry winning Whites (71% to 29%), while White performed well among African Americans (88% to 12%) and Latinos (61% to 38%)

Perry's fourth inauguration for a third full four-year term began on January 18, 2011, on the State Capitol South Grounds.

Election rules
Texas had not have term limits for its governors; thus, gubernatorial incumbents have been free to run as often as they want if they are eligible for the office.

The Republicans and Democrats chose their gubernatorial nominees based on the results of primary votes held on March 2, 2010 (the first Tuesday in March.) Both parties' candidates received at least 20 percent of the total votes cast for governor in the 2006 election; thus, they must nominate their candidates via primary election.

Any third-party which obtains ballot access must nominate its candidates via a statewide convention, which by law must be held on June 12, 2010 (the second Saturday in June.) The Libertarian Party obtained ballot access automatically due to its 2008 showing, in which one of its nominees attracted over one million votes.

In the primary election the party's winning candidate must garner a majority (over 50%) of votes cast; otherwise, the top two candidates face each other in a runoff election. However, in the general election, the winning candidate needs only a plurality of votes to be elected Governor (as was the case with the 2006 election and the 1990 election, in which Libertarian Jeff Daiell attracted over 129,000 votes).

Independent and write-in candidates may seek ballot access; however, the criteria for such access are quite strict (see "Ballot Access" below). Nevertheless, in the 2006 election, two independent candidates, Carole Keeton Strayhorn, the Republican State Comptroller, and Kinky Friedman, a popular Texas country musician, obtained enough signatures to qualify. The Libertarian nominee, James Werner, was on the ballot automatically because of that party's Texas showing in the 2004 general election.

Ballot access

Political party candidates
Any political party whose candidate for governor, during the 2006 election, garnered at least 20 percent of the total votes cast, must nominate all its candidates for all offices sought via primary election. In the 2006 election, both the Democratic candidate (Chris Bell) and the Republican candidate (Rick Perry) received this many votes; thus, both parties must hold primary elections using the two-round system. The primary elections must be held on the first Tuesday in March, and a candidate must receive a majority of votes cast in the primary election; otherwise, a runoff election between the top two finishers must be held on the second Tuesday in April.

A political party whose candidate for governor, during the 2006 election, received at least two percent but less than 20 percent of the total votes cast, may nominate its candidates for all offices sought via either a primary election (using the two-round system) or a state convention. If the party chooses to conduct a primary election, it must notify the Texas Secretary of State at least one year prior to the general election date and must nominate all its candidates via primary election. No third-party candidate met this requirement in 2006; the last to do so was the Libertarian Party in 1990 (when nominee Jeff Daiell polled over 3.3% of the vote).

All other political parties must nominate their candidates via state convention, which by law must be held on the second Saturday in June. In order to qualify for ballot access at the general election, the party must either:
have had at least one candidate, in the previous statewide election, garner at least five percent of the total votes cast for that office (only the Libertarian Party met this requirement), or
within 75 days after conducting its precinct conventions, submit lists of said conventions, whose total participant count equals at least one percent of the total votes cast in the previous gubernatorial election.
If the political party cannot meet the precinct convention count requirement, it may file a supplemental petition, the number of signatures on which, when added to the count from the precinct convention lists, totals the required one percent, but must do so within the 75-day period above. Any person signing a supplemental petition must not have voted in any party's primary election or runoff election, or participated in any other third-party's convention.

Independent candidates
Should an independent gubernatorial candidate seek ballot access in the state of Texas, the candidate must meet the following requirements:
The candidate must obtain signatures from registered voters, in an amount equalling at least one percent of the total votes cast in the prior gubernatorial election, the same as for third-party access.
The signatures must come from registered voters who did not vote in either the Democratic or Republican primaries or in any runoff elections for governor.
The signatures must come from registered voters who have not signed a petition for any other independent candidate. If a supporter signed more than one petition, only the first signature counts.
The signatures cannot be obtained until after the primary election (if either political party primary requires a runoff election, the signatures cannot be obtained until after such runoff election) and the petition must be filed no later than 5:00 pm (Austin time, the filing must be with the Texas Secretary of State) on the 30th day after the scheduled runoff primary election day (even if none is held).

Write-in candidates
In the event a candidate does not qualify for independent status, the person may still run as a write-in candidate. The candidate must either:
pay a $3,750 filing fee, or
submit 5,000 qualified signatures. However, the petition must be filed by 5:00 pm of the 70th day before general election day, and cannot be filed earlier than 30 days before this deadline.

Republican primary

Candidates
 Kay Bailey Hutchison, U.S. Senator
 Debra Medina, political activist
 Rick Perry, incumbent governor

Endorsements

Polling
Note: polls used different sample sizes and citizen groups. A candidate must have a majority of the vote (>50%) to avoid a runoff with their second place opponent.

Results

Democratic primary

Candidates

Declared
 Alma Ludivina Aguado, physician
 Felix Alvarado, educator and U.S. Air Force veteran
 Bill Dear, private investigator
 Clement E. Glenn, associate professor of education at Prairie View A&M University
 Star Locke, homebuilder
 Farouk Shami, businessman
 Bill White, former mayor of Houston

Withdrew
 Tom Schieffer, former U.S. Ambassador to Japan & U.S. Ambassador to Australia

Endorsements

Polling

* Dropped out prior to the primary.

Results

General election

Candidates
Rick Perry (R), incumbent governor
Bill White (D), former Houston mayor
Kathie Glass (L), attorney
 Deb Shafto (G), educator
 Andy Barron (write-in), orthodontist

Predictions

Polling

Results

References

External links
Texas Secretary of State – Elections Division
Texas Governor Candidates at Project Vote Smart
Campaign contributions for 2010 Texas Governor from Follow the Money
2010 Texas Gubernatorial General Election: Rick Perry (R) vs Bill White (D) graph of multiple polls from Pollster.com
Election 2010: Texas Governor from Rasmussen Reports
2010 Texas Governor Race from Real Clear Politics
2010 Texas Governor's Race from CQ Politics
Race Profile in The New York Times

Debate:
Texas Republican Gubernatorial Primary Debate on C-SPAN, January 14, 2010

Voter resources:
 Am I registered to vote? – Also finds your polling place
 What is on the ballot? – Official lists of candidates (PDF)
 Imagine Election – Look up who will be on your ballot by zip code (includes US Representative, Governor and other state-level races, and state legislature)

Republican candidates for Governor:
 Kay Bailey Hutchison for Governor
 Debra Medina for Governor
 Rick Perry for Governor Republican nominee

Democratic candidates for Governor:
 Alma Aguado for Governor
 Felix Alvarado for Governor
 Bill Dear for Governor
 Clement Glenn for Governor
 Farouk Shami for Governor
 Bill White for Governor Democratic nominee

Libertarian candidate for governor:
 Kathie Glass for Governor Libertarian nominee

Third party/Independent candidates for Governor:
 Fran Cavanaugh for Governor
 Hank Gilbert for Governor
 Kenneth Griffin for Governor
 Larry Kilgore for Governor
 Tom Schieffer for Governor
 Kevin Still for Governor
 Kinky Friedman for Governor

2010
Gubernatorial
Texas
Rick Perry